Peace pipe is a colonial, English-language misnomer for a ceremonial pipe used by some Native American cultures.

Peace Pipe may also refer to:

Peace Pipe (Ben Allison album), 2002
Peace Pipe (Redbone album), 2005
 "Peace Pipe", a 1975 song by B. T. Express
 "Peace Pipe", a 1993 song by Cry of Love
 Bowling Green–Toledo Peace Pipe, college football trophy in the Bowling Green–Toledo football rivalry
 Tiger-Sooner Peace Pipe, college football trophy in the Missouri–Oklahoma football rivalry

See also 
 Chanunpa
 Pipe smoking
 Tobacco pipe